Elles Bailey is an English blues rock singer, songwriter, and pianist. She has recorded five studio albums since her debut with Wildfire in 2017, winning several awards for her work. 

Her 2022 studio album Shining in the Half Light reached 42 in the UK Albums Chart, reached number 1 in the Official Jazz and Blues Albums Chart and number 2 in the Official Americana Albums Chart. In January 2023, The Official Charts Company announced that Shining in the Half Light had reached number 39 out of the top 40 best selling albums in the Official Americana Albums Chart in 2022.

On tour, apart from her own headline appearances, Bailey has provided the opening act for Don McLean, Van Morrison, Eric Gales, Mike Farris, the Kris Barras Band and King King. She is a presenter on Planet Rock Radio.

Early life and career
She was born in Bristol, England. At the age of three she was hospitalised as a result of contracting viral and bacterial pneumonia, which meant that she had to breathe through a tube for 17 days.  The result was she emerged with a husky deep voice, which shocked her parents and necessitated further examination to ensure that no serious damage had occurred. She was introduced to music via her father's record collection; mostly Chess Records' blues and rock and roll discs. She began fronting a local indie rock band, before the pull of her love of the blues and Americana, led Bailey to assemble a compatible touring band.  Her debut EP, Who Am I to Me (2015), was followed by the six track collection The Elberton Sessions (2016). The band toured and became noted for its powerful performances at gigs.

Professional career
Bailey's debut studio album for Outlaw Music, Wildfire (2017), was recorded in Nashville, Tennessee, under the guidance of record producer Brad Nowell. Bailey co-wrote the majority of the 12 tracks on the collection, but included her rendition of Taylor Swift's "Shake It Off". Immediately after the recording was finalised, Bailey and her band (which included Brent Mason) toured both North America and the UK. The album was predated on 10 February 2017 by the single release of the track "Wildfire". In 2019, Bailey's next studio album, Road I Call Home, reached the top of the UK Blues Chart. It was recorded in Nashville, with recordings jammed in between a 97 date concert tour across Europe. It got the 'Album of the Year' gong at UKBlues Awards with another going to Bailey as 'Artist of the Year'. An album track, "Little Piece of Heaven" (co-written with Bobby Wood and Dan Auerbach gained the 'UK Song of the Year' title at the 2020 Americana Music Honors & Awards. During the COVID-19 pandemic, Bailey gave out a series of livestream recordings of her versions of others recorded music.  The resultant studio album, Ain't Nothing But, got a nomination for 'Blues Album of the Year' at the 2021 UKBlues Awards, where she was named 'Artist of the Year' for the second consecutive year.

Her next studio album, Shining in the Half Light, was recorded in Devon in the midst of a COVID-19 lockdown when Bailey was months into her pregnancy. She co-wrote the entire album's worth of songs with collaborators from around the globe. It was produced by Dan Weller. The main musicians used included Joe Wilkins (guitar), Jonny Henderson (keyboards), Matthew Waer (bass guitar) and Matthew Jones (drums). It was released on 25 February 2022. Due to the logistics surrounding the recording processes, Bailey listened to the album's final mixes while in hospital awaiting to give  birth. To add to the difficulties, Bailey herself caught COVID-19 only weeks after the album's launch date. 

Shining in the Half Light reached number 42 in the UK Albums Chart, peaked at number 1 in the Official Jazz and Blues Albums Chart and number 2 in the Official Americana Albums Chart. It peaked at number four in the UK Independent Albums Chart, having been number one on the UK Independent Album Breakers Chart. In January 2023, The Official Charts Company announced that Shining in the Half Light had reached number 39 out of the top 40 best selling albums in the Official Americana Albums Chart in 2022.

Later in 2022, Bailey was confirmed as the support act for the 50th Anniversary American Pie Tour by Don McLean in September and October that year. This was preceded in August with her slot on Joe Bonamassa's Keeping the Blues Alive at Sea Cruise. She has previously supplied guest support roles for tours for Mike Farris, the Kris Barras Band and King King. Bailey also performed at the 2021 Cheltenham Music Festival.

Discography

Studio albums

References

External links

Year of birth missing (living people)
Living people
English women singers
English blues singers
English women singer-songwriters
21st-century English women singers
21st-century English singers
English women pianists
Blues singer-songwriters
Blues rock musicians
Musicians from Bristol
21st-century women pianists
English radio presenters